This is a list of banks in Asia (alphabetically)

Afghanistan

Central Bank
Da Afghanistan Bank

Commercial Bank
Afghan United Bank
Afghanistan International Bank (AIB)
Bank Alfalah
Aryanbank
Azizi Bank
Bakter Bank
Bank-e-Millie Afghan
Brak Afghanistan Bank
First MicroFinance Bank
Ghazanfar Bank
HDFC Bank
HBL Afghanistan
Miawand Bank
National Bank Of Afghanistan
National Bank of Pakistan
New Kabul Bank
Pashtany Bank
Standard Chartered Bank

Bahrain

Ahli United Bank
Arab Banking Corporation
Bahrain Islamic Bank
Bank of Bahrain and Kuwait
Bank Melli Iran
Citibank
Gulf International Bank
HSBC Bank (Middle East)
ICICI Bank
National Bank of Bahrain
Saderat bank of Iran
Standard Chartered Bank
State Bank of India

Bangladesh

 Bangladesh Bank
 Bangladesh Krishi Bank
 Grameen Bank
 Sonali Bank
 Janata Bank
 Rupali Bank
 Bangladesh Development Bank Limited
 Islami Bank Bangladesh Limited
 Al Arafah Islami Bank Limited
 Prime Bank
 Premier Bank
 Commercial Bank of Ceylon
 Dutch Bangla Bank
 Exim Bank
 Eastern Bank Limited
 HSBC Bank
 Standard Chartered Bank
 Citibank N.A
 Bank Asia
 BRAC Bank
 Midland Bank
 Bank Al Falah Limited
 Trust Bank
 State Bank of India
 Woori India

Cambodia 
The Association of Banks in Cambodia (ABC) provides networking opportunities, social events, educational programs and industry updates for banking professionals in Cambodia.

Commercial Bank

ACLEDA Bank
Advanced Bank of Asia
Agribank Cambodia
ANZ Royal Bank
Bangkok Bank PLC
Bank for Investment and Development of Cambodia PLC
Bank of China
Bank of India
Booyoung Khmer Bank
Cambodia Asia Bank
Cambodia Commercial Bank
Cambodia Mekong Bank
Cambodia Post Bank PLC
Cambodian Public Bank
Canadia Bank
Cathay United Bank (Cambodia)
CIMB Bank PLC
First Commercial Bank
Foreign Trade Bank of Cambodia
Hong Leong Bank Berhad
Industrial and Commercial Bank of China Limited
Kookmin Bank Cambodia PLC
Krung Thai Bank PLC
Maruhan Japan Bank PLC
Maybank
MB Bank PLC
Mega International Commercial Bank Co., Ltd
Phillip Bank PLC
Phnom Penh Commercial Bank
Prasac Microfinance Institution
RHB Indochina Bank Limited
Sacombank (Cambodia) PLC
Saigon Hanoi Commercial Joint Stock Bank
Shinhan Khmer Band
Taiwan Cooperative Bank (TCB)
The Shanghai Commercial & Savings Band, Ltd
Union Commercial Bank
Vattanac Bank

Specialized Bank

ANCO Specialized Bank
Angkor Capital Specialized Bank
Cam Capital Specialized Bank PLC
CAMKO Specialized Bank
Chief (Cambodia) Specialized Bank PLC
First Investment Specialized Bank
Oxley Worldbridge Specialized Bank PLC
PHSME Specialized Bank
The Rural Development Bank
Tomato Specialized Bank
Wing (Cambodia) Limited Specialized Bank

People's Republic of China

Central bank
People's Bank of China

Major banks
The Big four banks of China:
Agricultural Bank of China (No.2)
Bank of China (No.3)
China Construction Bank (No.4)
Industrial and Commercial Bank of China (No.1)

Small banks

Bank of Communications
China Bohai Bank
China CITIC Bank
China Everbright Bank
China Merchants Bank
China Minsheng Bank
Guangdong Development Bank
Huaxia Bank
Industrial Bank
Ping An Bank
Shanghai Pudong Development Bank

Local banks

Anshan City Commercial Bank
Bank of Jiujiang
Bank of Beijing
Bank of Dalian
Bank of Guangzhou
Bank of Guiyang
Bank of Hankou
Bank of Hebei
Bank of Hubei
Bank of Jilin (in Changchun)
Bank of Nanjing
Bank of Quanzhou
Bank of Shanghai
Baoji City Commercial Bank
Baotou City Commercial Bank
Changsha City Commercial Bank
Changzhou City Commercial Bank
Chengdu City Commercial Bank
Chongqing City Commercial Bank
Commercial Bank of Zhengzhou
Dandong City Commercial Bank
Daqing City Commercial Bank
Datong City Commercial Bank
Deyang City Commercial Bank
Dongguan City Commercial Bank
Fushun City Commercial Bank
Fuxin City Commercial Bank
Huludao City Commercial Bank
Fuzhou City Commercial Bank
Ganzhou City Commercial Bank
Guangdong Nan Yue Bank
Guilin City Commercial Bank
Hangzhou City Commercial Bank
Harbin Bank
Hengyang City Commercial Bank
Hohhot City Commercial Bank
Huai’an City Commercial Bank
Huzhou City Commercial Bank
Ji’nan City Commercial Bank
Jiaozuo City Commercial Bank
Jiaxing City Commercial Bank
Jilin City Commercial Bank - merged in 2007 to Bank of Jilin
Jinhua City Commercial Bank
Jinzhou City Commercial Bank
Jiujiang City Commercial Bank
Kaifeng City Commercial Bank
Kunming City Commercial Bank
Langfang City Commercial Bank
Lanzhou City Commercial Bank
Leshan City Commercial Bank
Lianyungang City Commercial Bank
Liaoyang City Commercial Bank
Linyi City Commercial Bank
Liuzhou City Commercial Bank
Luoyang City Commercial Bank
Luzhou City Commercial Bank
Mianyang City Commercial Bank
Nanchang City Commercial Bank
Nanchong City Commercial Bank
Nanjing City Commercial Bank
Nantong City Commercial Bank
Nanyang City Commercial Bank
Ningbo City Commercial Bank
Panzhihua City Commercial Bank
Qingdao City Commercial Bank
Qiqihr City Commercial Bank
Rizhao City Commercial Bank
Shaoxing City Commercial Bank
Shengjing Bank (in Shenyang)
Suzhou City Commercial Bank
Taiyuan City Commercial Bank
Taizhou Commercial Bank
Tianjin City Commercial Bank
Wanzhou City Commercial Bank
Weifang City Commercial Bank
Weihai City commercial Bank
Wenzhou City Commercial Bank
Wuxi City Commercial Bank
Yancheng City Commercial Bank
Yangzhou City Commercial Bank
Yantai City Commercial Bank
Yichuan City Commercial Bank
Yingkou City Commercial Bank
Xi’an City Commercial Bank
Xi'An Commercial Bank
Xiamen Bank
Xiangtan City Commercial Bank
Xianyang City Commercial Bank
Xining City Commercial Bank
Xinxiang City Commercial Bank
Xuzhou City Commercial Bank
Yueyang City Commercial Bank
Zhejiang Tailong Commercial Bank
Zhunyi City Commercial Bank
Zhuhai CRC Bank
Zhenjiang City Commercial Bank
Zibo City Commercial Bank
Zigong City Commercial Bank
Zhuzhou City Commercial Bank

Defunct banks
Hainan Development Bank
Shenzhen Development Bank

Institutional banks
Agricultural Development Bank of China
China Development Bank
The Export-Import Bank of China (China Exim Bank)

Hong Kong SAR

Major banks
Bank of China (Hong Kong)
Bank of East Asia
Hang Seng Bank
Hong Kong and Shanghai Banking Corporation
Standard Chartered Hong Kong

Defunct or merged banks

Bank of Canton
First Pacific Bank
Fortis Bank Asia HK
Generale Belgian Bank
Hong Nin Savings Bank
Kwong On Bank
The National Commercial Bank Limited
Wing On Bank

Macau SAR

India

Central bank
Reserve Bank of India

Nationalized banks

Bank of Baroda
Bank of India
Bank of Maharashtra
Canara Bank
Central Bank of India
Dena Bank
IDBI Bank
Indian Bank
Indian Overseas Bank
Punjab & Sind Bank
Punjab National Bank
State Bank of India
UCO Bank
Union Bank of India

Old private sector banks

 City Union Bank
 Dhanlaxmi Bank
 Federal Bank
 Jammu & Kashmir Bank
 Karur Vysya Bank
 Lakshmi Vilas Bank
 Nainital Bank
 Saraswat Bank
 Tamilnad Mercantile Bank

New private sector banks

 Axis Bank (Formerly UTI Bank)
 Bandhan Bank
 HDFC Bank
 IDFC FIRST Bank
 ICICI Bank
 IndusInd Bank
 ING Vysya Bank
 Karnataka Bank
 Kotak Mahindra Bank
 Yes Bank
 RBL Bank

Foreign banks operating in India

 ABN AMRO Bank N.V.
 First Abu Dhabi Bank
 Abu Dhabi Commercial Bank
 American Express Bank
 Antwerp Diamond Bank
 Arab Bangladesh Bank
 Bank of America NA
 Bank of Bahrain and Kuwait
 Bank of Ceylon
 Bank Internasional Indonesia
 Bank of Nova Scotia (Scotia Bank)
 Bank of Tokyo Mitsubishi UFJ
 Barclays Bank PLC
 BNP Paribas
 Calyon Bank
 Chinatrust Commercial Bank
 Citibank N.A.
 DBS Bank
 Deutsche Bank AG
 HSBC
 ING
 JPMorgan Chase Bank
 Krung Thai Bank
 Mashreq Bank psc
 Mizuho Corporate Bank
 Oman International Bank S.A.O.G.
 Royal Bank of Scotland
 Shinhan Bank
 Société Générale
 Sonali Bank
 Standard Chartered Bank
 State Bank of Mauritius
 UBS
 VTB

Cooperative banks

Cosmos Bank
Rupee Cooperative Bank Ltd.
Shamrao Vithal Co-operative Bank Ltd
 Ahmadabad Urdan Cooperation Bank
 Mumbai City Cooperation Bank
 NCR Bank
 City Urban Cooperation Bank
 Aawadha Bank
 Kasi Gomati Rural Bank
 BOB Estern Bank
 BOB Wastern Bank
 Zila Cooperation Bank Faizabad UP
 Zila Cooperation Bank Gorakhapur UP
 Zila Cooperation Bank Kanpur UP
 Zila Cooperation Bank Varanasi UP
 Zila Cooperation Bank Allhabad UP
 Zila Cooperation Bank Lucknow UP
 Zila Cooperation Bank Jhansi UP
 Zila Cooperation Bank Meerut UP
 Zila Cooperation Bank Gaziyabad UP
 Zila Cooperation Bank Aligarh UP
 Zila Cooperation Bank Bhopal MP
 Zila Cooperation Bank Indore 
 Zila Cooperation Bank Rewa
 Zila Cooperation Bank Jabalpur
 Zila Cooperation Bank Raipur
 Zila Cooperation Bank Ayodhya
 Zila Cooperation Bank Kota
 Zila Cooperation Bank Shivapuri
 Zila Cooperation Bank Patna
 Zila Cooperation Bank Bagosare
 Zila Cooperation Bank Baxer
 Zila Cooperation Bank Jaipur
 Zila Cooperation Bank Uadaypur
 Zila Cooperation Bank Ajmer
 Zila Cooperation Bank Bilasapur
 Zila Cooperation Bank Jammu
 Zila Cooperation Bank Shri Nagar
 Zila Cooperation Bank Silmla
 Zila Cooperation Bank Kulu
 Zila Cooperation Bank Dehradun
 Zila Cooperation Bank Nanitaal
 Zila Cooperation Bank Chandigarh
 Zila Cooperation Bank Gurugram
 Zila Cooperation Bank Amritsar
 Zila Cooperation Bank Ludhiana
 Zila Cooperation Bank Bhatinda
 Zila Cooperation Bank Ladaka
 Zila Cooperation Bank Leh
 Zila Cooperation Bank Guwahati
 Zila Cooperation Bank Itanagar
 Zila Cooperation Bank Gangtok
 Zila Cooperation Bank Kohima
 Zila Cooperation Bank Kolkata
 Zila Cooperation Bank Siliguri
 Zila Cooperation Bank Bhuvaneshvar
 Zila Cooperation Bank Cutak
 Zila Cooperation Bank Orrisa
 Zila Cooperation Bank Vizag
 Zila Cooperation Bank Vishakhapattanam
 Zila Cooperation Bank Vijaywada
 Zila Cooperation Bank Shriciti
 Zila Cooperation Bank Amarvati
 Zila Cooperation Bank Haidarabad
 Zila Cooperation Bank Kinnaur
 Zila Cooperation Bank Oti
 Zila Cooperation Bank Tirupati
 Zila Cooperation Bank Auragabad
 Zila Cooperation Bank Nagpur
 Zila Cooperation Bank Pune
 Zila Cooperation Bank Nasik
 Zila Cooperation Bank Mumbai Navi
 Zila Cooperation Bank Thane
 Zila Cooperation Bank Solapur
 Zila Cooperation Bank Yovtmal
 Zila Cooperation Bank Bangalore
 Zila Cooperation Bank Rameshwarerm
 Zila Cooperation Bank Machlipattm
 Zila Cooperation Bank Padji
 Zila Cooperation Bank Vocodigma
 Zila Cooperation Bank Kochin
 Zila Cooperation Bank Kanyakumari
 Zila Cooperation Bank Shivakashi
 Zila Cooperation Bank Coimbatore
 Zila Cooperation Bank Madurai
 Zila Cooperation Bank Tiruchirappalli
 Zila Cooperation Bank Duo
 Zila Cooperation Bank Port Blear
 Zila Cooperation Bank Indra Port
 Zila Cooperation Bank Karwati
 Zila Cooperation Bank Nagapattinam

Rural Bank
 UP East Rural Bank
 UP West Rural Bank
 Kasi Gomati Rural Bank
 Hariyana Rural Bank
 Uttarakhand Rural Bank
 PNB Rural Bank
 J&K Rural Bank
 Himachal Pradesh Rural Bank
 Allhabad Rural Bihar Bank 
 Madhya Bharat Rural Bank
 Jharkhand Rural Bank
 Central Bangla Rural Bank
 Assemia HDFC Rural Bank
 ICICI Rajasthan Rural Bank
 Raipur Rural Bank Chhattisgarh
 Orrisa Rural Bank
 Coastal Rural Bank Andhra
 Island Axix Rural Bank
 Tripur Rural Bank
 SBI North East Rural Bank
 Arrunprabha Rural Bank
 Dena Rural Bank Chandigarh
 South Bank Rural Tamilanadu
 Maratratha Rural Bank
 Goa Rural Bank

Payment Bank
 BSNL Payment Bank
 MTNL Payment Bank
 Aditya Birla Nuvo
 M Commerce Services
 Airtel Bank
 Vodafone M Paisa
 Aircel Payment Service
 Jio Payment Getaway
 Paytm Bank
 Tata Payment Service

Merged Bank

Arbuthnot & Co
State Bank of Indore (Merged into State Bank of India)
State Bank of Saurashtra (Merged into State Bank of India)
Bank of Bombay (now part of the State Bank of India)
Bank of Calcutta (now part of the State Bank of India)
Bank of Chettinad
Bank of Madras (now part of the State Bank of India)
Bank of Madura (now part of ICICI Bank)
Centurion Bank of Punjab (now part of HDFC Bank)
Global Trust Bank (now part of Oriental Bank of Commerce)
Lord Krishna Bank (now part of Centurion Bank of Punjab)

Indonesia

Central bank
Bank Indonesia

State banks
Bank Ekspor Indonesia
Bank Mandiri
Bank Negara Indonesia
Bank Rakyat Indonesia
Bank Tabungan Negara

Public banks

Bank Artha Graha Internasional
Bank BRI Agro Niaga
Bank Bukopin
Bank Bumi Arta
Bank Bumiputera Indonesia
Bank Capital Indonesia
Bank Central Asia
Bank CIMB Niaga
Bank Danamon
Bank Eksekutif International
Bank Himpunan Saudara 1906
Bank Maybank Indonesia
Bank Kesawan
Bank Mayapada
Bank Mega
Bank Multicor
Bank Mutiara
Bank OCBC NISP
Bank Pan Indonesia
Bank Permata
Bank Sinarmas
Bank UOB Buana
Bank Victoria International

Private banks

Bank Agroniaga
Bank Akita
Bank Alfindo
Bank Anglomas Internasional (Merger pending with Wishart)
Bank Antardaerah
Bank Artos Indonesia
Bank Bintang Manunggal
Bank Bisnis Internasional
Bank Centratama Nasional
Bank CIC
Bank Dipo International
Bank Ekonomi Raharja
Bank Fama Internasional
Bank Ganesha
Bank Harda Internasional
Bank Harfa (Merger pending with Bank Panin)
Bank Harmoni International (Merger pending with Bank Index Selindo)
Bank IFI
Bank Ina Perdana
Bank Index Selindo (Merger pending with Bank Harmoni International)
Bank Jasa Arta
Bank Jasa Jakarta
Bank Kesejahteraan Ekonomi
Bank Liman International
Bank Maspion
Bank Mayora
Bank Mestika Dharma
Bank Metro Express
Bank Mitraniaga
Bank Multi Arta Sentosa
Bank Persyarikatan Indonesia
Bank Prima Master
Bank Purba Danarta
Bank Royal Indonesia
Bank Sinar Harapan Bali (Merger pending with Bank Mandiri)
Bank Sri Partha (Merger pending with Mercy Corp.)
Bank Swaguna
Bank Tabungan Pensiunan Nasional
Bank UIB
Bank Yudha Bhakti

Defunct banks

Bank Arta Niaga Kencana (Merged with Commonwealth Bank of Australia)
Bank Haga (Merged with Rabobank)
Bank Hagakita (Merged with Rabobank)
Bank Halim Indonesia (Merged with ICBC)
Bank Indomonex (Acquired by Bank of India and State Bank of India)
Bank Nusantara Parahyangan (Acquired by consortium of Acom and Bank of Tokyo Mitsubishi UFJ)
Bank Swadesi (Acquired by Bank of India and State Bank of India)
Bank Windu Kentjana (Merged with Bank Multicor)

Islamic banks

Bank Muamalat Indonesia
Bank Syariah Indonesia
Bank Syariah Mega Indonesia

Regional development banks

Bank DKI
Bank Kalteng
Bank Lampung
Bank Nagari
Bank Aceh Syariah
Bank BPD Bali
Bank Bengkulu
Bank BPD DIY
Bank Jambi
Bank BJB
Bank Jateng
Bank Jatim
Bank Kalbar
Bank Kalsel
Bank Kaltimtara
Bank Maluku Malut
Bank NTB Syariah
Bank NTT
Bank Papua
Bank Riau Kepri
Bank Sulselbar
Bank Sulteng
Bank Sultra
Bank Sulutgo
Bank Sumselbabel
Bank Sumut

Iran

Central bank 
 Central Bank of the Islamic Republic of Iran

Government-owned banks

Commercial banks 
 Bank Melli Iran
 Bank Sepah
 Post Bank of Iran

Specialised banks 
 Bank of Industry and Mine
 Bank Maskan
 Export Development Bank of Iran
 Qarz Al-Hasaneh Mehr Iran Bank
 Bank Keshavarzi Iran
 Qarz Al-Hasaneh Resalat Bank
 Tose'e Ta'avon Bank

Non-government-owned banks 

 Ayandeh Bank
 Bank Mellat
 Bank Pasargad
 Bank Saderat Iran
 Bank Shahr
 Bank Day
 EN Bank
 Iran Zamin Bank
 Karafarin Bank
 Parsian Bank
 Refah Bank
 Saman Bank
 Sarmayeh Bank
 Sina Bank
 Tejarat Bank
 Tourism Bank
 Middle East Bank

Foreign banks 

 BankMuscat Bank Muscat SAOG (Oman)
 Erste Bank (Austria)
  (aka The Iran-Europe Commercial Bank) (Germany)
 Future Bank (Bahrain)
 Islamic Development Cooperation and Regional Investment Bank (Iraq)
 Raiffeisen Bank (Austria)
 Standard Chartered (UK)
 UCO Bank Ltd (India)
 Woori Bank (South Korea)

Standard Chartered said it closed down all its Iranian branches in the first quarter of 2012.

Binational banks 
 Iran-Venezuela Bi-National Bank

Financial and credit institutions 

 Askariye Finance and Credit Institution
 Credit Institution for Development
 Ghavamin Finance and Credit Institution
 Mehr Finance and Credit Institution
 Pishgaman Finance and Credit Institution Iran (Āti)
 Salehin Finance and Credit Institution
 Samen Alaemeh Credit Cooperative

Investment institutions 
 AminIB

Iraq

Central bank
Central Bank of Iraq

Major banks
Rafidain Bank
Rasheed Bank

Israel

Central bank
Bank of Israel

Major banks

Bank Hapoalim
Bank Leumi
Bank Mizrahi-Tefahot
Bank Otsar Ha-Hayal
First International Bank of Israel
Israel Discount Bank
Union Bank of Israel

Japan

Central bank
Bank of Japan

Government Institutions 

 Development Bank of Japan
 Japan Bank for International Cooperation
 Japan Finance Corporation
 Japan Housing Finance Agency
 Okinawa Development Finance Corporation
 Shoko Chukin Bank

Major banking groups

Aozora Bank
Mitsubishi UFJ Financial Group
Mitsubishi Tokyo Financial Group (merged with UFJ Holdings to form Mitsubishi UFJ Financial Group)
UFJ Holdings (merged with Mitsubishi Tokyo Financial Group to form Mitsubishi UFJ Financial Group)
Mitsui Trust Holdings
Mizuho Financial Group
Resona Holdings, Inc.
Shinsei Bank
Sumitomo Mitsui Banking Corporation
Sumitomo Trust and Banking

Regional banks

The 77 Bank
Akita Bank
Aomori Bank
Bank of Iwate
Bank of Kyoto
Chiba Kōgyō Bank
Hokkaido Bank
Hokkoku Bank
Hokuriku Bank
Hokuto Bank
Hokuyo Bank
Joyo Bank
Kanto Tsukuba Bank
Michinoku Bank
Sapporo Bank
Shonai Bank
Toho Bank
Tohoku Bank
Yamagata Bank
Yamanashi Chuo Bank

Other banks
Seven Bank
Sony Bank

Jordan

Ahli Commercial Bank (Jordan National Bank)
Ahli Corporate Bank
Arab Bank
Arab Banking Corporation
Arab Finance House
Arab Finance Investment House
Arab Investment Bank
Bank Audi
Bank of Jordan
BLOM Bank
Capital Bank (ex-Export and Finance Bank)
Cairo Amman Bank
Central Bank of Jordan
Citibank
Citigroup
Egyptian Arab Land Bank
German Development Bank
HSBC
Industrial Development Bank
Islamic International Arab Bank
Jordan Commercial Bank
Jordan Gulf Bank
Jordan Investment and Finance Bank
Jordan Islamic Bank for Finance and Investment
Jordan Kuwait Bank
JordInvest (Jordan Investment Trust)
Middle East for Investment
National Bank of Kuwait
Rafidain Bank
Société Générale
Standard Chartered Bank
The Housing Bank of Trade and Finance
The Islamic Bank
Union Bank for Savings and Investments

Korea, Republic of

Central bank
Bank of Korea

Big 4 banks
Hana Bank
Kookmin Bank
Shinhan Bank
Woori Bank

Exchange bank
KEB Korea Exchange Bank (외환은행) is the biggest exchange bank in Korea.

Major regional banks
Busan Bank
Daegu Bank
Jeju Bank
Jeonbuk Bank

Other banks

Credit Union
Industrial Bank of Korea (IBK)
Korea Development Bank (KDB)
Korea Federation of Community Credit Cooperatives
Korea Post
NH Nonghyup Bank (Held by National Agricultural Cooperative Federation of Korea)
Suhyup (or Su-hyeop, the National Federation of Fisheries Cooperatives)

Foreign-owned banks
Citibank
Deutsche Bank
Hong Kong and Shanghai Banking Corporation (HSBC)
Standard Chartered Bank Korea

Kuwait

 Al-Ahli Bank of Kuwait
 Ahli United Bank
 Bank of Bahrain and Kuwait
 BNP Paribas Kuwait
 Boubyan Bank
 Burgan Bank
 Central Bank of Kuwait
 Citibank Kuwait
 Commercial Bank of Kuwait
 Credit & Saving Bank
 Gulf Bank of Kuwait
 HSBC Kuwait
 HDFC BANK
 Industrial Bank of Kuwait
 Kuwait Finance House
 Kuwait International Bank
 National Bank of Kuwait
 United Gulf Bank

Lebanon

Central bank
 Banque du Liban

Major banks

 Audi Saradar Bank S.A.L
 Bank Med S.A.L
 Bank of Beirut S.A.L.
 BLOM Bank S.A.L.
 Byblos Bank S.A.L.
 Citibank, N.A.
 Crédit Libanais S.A.L.
 Federal Bank of Lebanon S.A.L.
 Fransabank S.A.L.

Other banks

 Al-Mawarid Bank S.A.L.
 Arab Investment Bank S.A.L.
 B.L.C. Bank S.A.L.
 Bank Al Madina S.A.L.
 Banque BEMO S.A.L.
 Banque de la Bekaa S.A.L.
 Banque de l'Habitat S.A.L.
 Banque de l'Industrie Et Du Travail S.A.L.
 Banque Lati S.A.L.
 Banque Misr Liban S.A.L.
 BBAC S.A.L.
 BSL BANK S.A.L.
 Creditbank S.A.L.
 FFA Private Bank
 Finance Bank S.A.L.
 First National Bank S.A.L.
 MEAB S.A.L.
 Méditerranée Investment Bank S.A.L.
 Near East Commercial Bank S.A.L.
 Société Générale de Banque au Liban S.A.L.

Foreign banks

 Arab Finance House S.A.L.
 Banca Di Roma S.P.A
 Bank of Kuwait And The Arab World S.A.L.
 Banque Libano-Française S.A.L.
 Banque Nationale de Paris "Intercontinentale"
 HSBC Bank Middle East Limited
 Intercontinental Bank of Lebanon S.A.L.
 Lebanon & Gulf Bank S.A.L.
 Lebanese Canadian Bank S.A.L.
 Lebanese Islamic Bank S.A.L.
 Lebanese Swiss Bank S.A.L.
 National Bank of Kuwait (Lebanon) S.A.L.
 Saderat Bank of Iran
 Standard Chartered Bank S.A.L.
 Syrian Lebanese Commercial Bank S.A.L.

Maldives 
Bank of Ceylon
Bank of Maldives
Commercial Bank of Maldives
State Bank of India

Malaysia 
Refer to List of banks in Malaysia for more info

Mongolia 
Trade and Development Bank of Mongolia

Myanmar

Central Bank 
 Central Bank of Myanmar

Government-Operated Banks 
 Myanma Agricultural Development Bank
 Myanma Economic Bank
 Myanma Foreign Trade Bank
 Myanma Investment and Commercial Bank

Semi-government banks 
 Construction, Housing and Infrastructure Development Bank
 Global Treasure Bank (formerly Myanmar Livestock and Fisheries Development Bank)
 Innwa Bank
 Mineral Development Bank
 Myawaddy Bank
 Nay Pyi Taw Development Bank
 Rural Development Bank
 Yadanabon Bank
 Yangon City Bank

Commercial Banks 
 AGD Bank
 Asia-Yangon Bank
 AYA Bank
 A Bank
 Co-operative Bank (CB Bank)
 Myanmar Citizens Bank
 Glory Farmer Development Bank (G Bank)
 KBZ Bank
 MAB Bank
 Myanmar Microfinance Bank
 Myanmar Oriental Bank
 Myanma Tourism Bank
 Shwe Rural and Urban Development Bank (Shwe Bank)
 Tun Commercial Bank (formerly Tun Foundation Bank)
 UAB Bank
 Yoma Bank
 First Private Bank
 Small & Medium Enterprises Development Bank

Foreign banks 
(notified by Central Bank of Myanmar)
 State Bank of India
 MUFG Bank
 Sumitomo Mitsui Banking Corporation
 OCBC Bank
 United Overseas Bank
 Bangkok Bank
 Industrial and Commercial Bank of China
 Maybank
 Mizuho Bank
 Australia and New Zealand Banking Group
 Bank for Investment and Development of Vietnam (BIDV)
 Shinhan Bank
 E.SUN Commercial Bank

Nepal

Central Bank 
Nepal Rastra Bank

Foreign Banks 
 Nepal SBI Bank
 Standard Chartered Nepal

Government-Operated Banks 
Agriculture Development Bank
Nepal Bank
Rastriya Banijya Bank

Semi-government Banks 

 Nepal Infrastructure Bank

Commercial Banks 

Bank of Kathmandu
Century Bank Limited
Citizens Bank International
Civil Bank
Everest Bank
Global IME Bank
Himalayan Bank
Kumari Bank 
Laxmi Bank
Machhapuchchhre Bank
Mega Bank Nepal
Nabil Bank
Nepal Bangladesh Bank
Nepal Credit and Commerce Bank 
Nepal Investment Bank
NIC Asia Bank
NMB Bank
Prabhu Bank
Prime Commercial Bank
Sanima Bank
Siddhartha Bank
Sunrise Bank

Development Banks 

 Corporate Development Bank
 Excel Development Bank
 Garima Bikas Bank
 Green Development Bank
 Jyoti Bikas Bank
 Kamana Sewa Bikas Bank
 Karnali Development Bank
 Lumbini Bikas Bank
 Mahalaxmi Development Bank
 Miteri Development Bank
 Muktinath Bikas Bank
 Narayani Development Bank
 Salapa Bikas Bank
 Saptakoshi Development Bank
 Sangrila Development Bank
 Shine Resunga Development Bank
 Sindhu Bikas Bank

Finance Institutions 

 Best Finance
 Capital Merchant Banking & Finance
 Central Finance
 Goodwill Finance
 Gorkhas Finance
 Guheshwori Merchant Banking & Finance
 ICFC Finance
 Janaki Finance Company
 Manjushree Finance
 Multipurpose Finance Company
 Nepal Finance
 Nepal Share Markets and Finance
 Pokhara Finance
 Progressive Finance
 Reliance Finance
 Samridhhi Finance Company
 Shree Investment & Finance Company

Pakistan

Central bank
 State Bank of Pakistan

Nationalized scheduled banks
 Bank of Punjab
 First Women Bank
 National Bank of Pakistan
 Sindh Bank

Specialized banks
 Industrial Development Bank
 Punjab Provincial Cooperative Bank
 SME Bank
 Zarai Taraqiati Bank

Private scheduled banks

 Allied Bank of Pakistan, Karachi
 Askari Bank, Rawalpindi
 Bank AL Habib, Karachi
 Bank Alfalah, Karachi
 Bank of Punjab, Lahore
 Barclays Bank, Karachi
 Faysal Bank, Karachi
 Habib Metropolitan Bank, Karachi
 Habib Bank, Karachi
 HSBC
 JS Bank
 KASB Bank, Karachi
 MCB Bank Limited (formerly Muslim Commercial Bank), Islamabad
 MyBank Limited, acquired by and merged with Summit Bank, Karachi
 NIB Bank, Karachi
 Samba Bank, Karachi
 Silk Bank formerly Saudi Pak Non-Commercial Bank, Karachi
 Soneri Bank, Karachi
 Summit Bank, Karachi
 United Bank, Karachi

Development financial institutions

 House Building Finance Corporation, Karachi
 Investment Corporation of Pakistan, Karachi
 Pak Kuwait Investment Company Limited, Karachi
 Pak Libya Holding Company Limited, Karachi
 Pak-Oman Investment Company Limited, Karachi
 Saudi Pak Industrial and Agricultural Investment Company (Pvt) Limited, Islamabad

Investment banks

 Al-Towfeek Investment Bank Limited
 Alzamin Investment Bank
 Asset Investment Bank Limited
 Escorts Investment Bank Limited
 Fidelity Investment Bank Limited
 IGI Investment Bank Limited
 Orix Investment Bank (Pakistan) Limited
 Trust Investment Bank Limited

Discount and guarantee houses
 First Credit & Discount Corp Limited
 National Discounting Services Limited
 Prudential Discount & Guarantee House Limited
 Speedway Fordmetall (Pakistan) Limited

Housing finance companies
 Citibank Housing Finance Company Limited
 House Building Finance Corporation
 International Housing Finance Limited

Venture capital companies
 Pakistan Venture Capital Limited
 Pakistan Emerging Ventures Limited

Micro finance banks

 The First Micro Finance Bank Limited
 Karakuram Bank
 Kashf Foundation Limited
 Khushhali Bank
 Network Micro Finance Bank
 Pak Oman Micro Finance Bank
 Rozgar Micro Finance Bank, Karachi
 Tameer Microfinance Bank Limited

Islamic banks

 AlBaraka Bank
 BankIslami Pakistan Limited
 Dawood Islamic Bank Limited (formerly First Dawood Islamic Bank Limited)
 Dubai Islamic Bank Pakistan Limited
 Meezan Bank

Philippines

Central bank
Bangko Sentral ng Pilipinas

Universal banks

Asia United Bank
Banco de Oro Universal Bank
Bank of the Philippine Islands
Chinabank
East West Unibank
Metropolitan Bank and Trust Company
Philippine National Bank
Rizal Commercial Banking Corporation
Security Bank
Union Bank of the Philippines
United Coconut Planters Bank

Commercial banks

Bank of Commerce
International Exchange Bank
Philippine Bank of Communications
Philippine Veterans Bank
Philtrust Bank
Robinsons Bank

Thrift banks

Allied Savings Bank
BPI Family Savings Bank (A subsidiary of BPI)
Centennial Savings Bank
China Bank Savings (A subsidiary of Chinabank)
City Savings Bank (A subsidiary of Unionbank)
Citystate Savings Bank
Luzon Development Bank
Orion Bank (new name since 2005 Tongyang Bank)
Philippine Savings Bank (A subsidiary of Metrobank)
Planters Development Bank (A subsidiary of Chinabank)
Premiere Development Bank
Producers Savings Banking Corporation
RCBC Savings Bank (A subsidiary of RCBC)
Real Bank (Acquired by BDO Unibank)
Bank of Makati

Rural banks

Banco San Juan (Acquired by BDO Unibank)
Bank of Florida
EastWest Rural Bank, Inc. (A subsidiary of East West Unibank)
New Rural Bank of Binalbagan, Inc.
One Network Bank (Acquired by BDO Unibank)
Rural Bank of Alaminos (Laguna)
Rural Bank of Bauang, Inc.
Rural Bank of Dolores
Rural Bank of San Pablo
Rural Bank of Tanay
Tiaong Rural Bank, Inc.

Government banks
Bangko Sentral ng Pilipinas (Central bank)
Development Bank of the Philippines
Land Bank of the Philippines
The Overseas Filipino Bank (OFB) (Subsidiary of Land Bank of the Philippines)
Al-Amanah Islamic Investment Bank of the Philippines (Subsidiary of Development Bank of the Philippines)

Islamic banks
Al-Amanah Islamic Investment Bank of the Philippines

Special banks
Asian Development Bank

Foreign banks

ABN AMRO
Bank of China
Chinatrust Bank
Citibank
DBS Bank
HSBC
Keppel Bank
Maybank
Standard Chartered Bank
United Overseas Bank
CIMB

Defunct or merged banks

Allied Bank (merge with PNB)
Banco Filipino
Equitable PCI Bank (acquired by Banco de Oro Universal Bank)
Export and Industry Bank
Far East Bank (acquired by Bank of the Philippine Islands)
Insular Savings Bank (acquired by Citibank, renamed Citibank Savings)
International Exchange Bank (merged with Union Bank of the Philippines)
 LBC Bank
Monte de Piedad Savings Bank (acquired by Keppel Bank)
Philippine Commercial International Bank (merged with Equitable Bank, renamed Equitable PCI Bank)
Prudential Bank (acquired by Bank of the Philippine Islands)
Urban Bank (closed then merged with Export and Industry Bank)
Keppel Bank (acquired by GE Money, renamed GE Money Savings Bank)
Solidbank (acquired by Metropolitan Bank and Trust Company)
Standard Chartered Bank (Philippines) (acquired by EastWest Bank)

Qatar 

Ahli Bank
Al khalij Commercial Bank (KCBC)
Arab Bank
Bank Saderat Iran
Doha Bank
HSBC
International Bank of Qatar
Mashreq Bank
Masraf Al Rayan
BNP Paribas
Qatar Central Bank
Qatar Development Bank
Qatar International Islamic Bank
Qatar Islamic Bank
Qatar National Bank
Standard Chartered Bank
State Bank of India
The Commercial Bank of Qatar
United Bank Limited

Singapore

Local banks
DBS Bank
Oversea-Chinese Banking Corporation (OCBC)
United Overseas Bank (UOB)

Qualifying full banks

ABN AMRO
BNP Paribas
Citibank International Personal Bank Singapore
Citibank Singapore
Hongkong and Shanghai Banking Corporation
Malayan Banking
Standard Chartered Bank

Merged local banks
Keppel Bank
Overseas Union Bank (OUB)
POSBank
Tat Lee Bank

Sri Lanka

Central Bank
Central Bank of Sri Lanka

Licensed Commercial Banks

Amana Bank
Axis Bank Ltd.
Bank of Ceylon
Cargills Bank
Citibank N.A.
Commercial Bank of Ceylon PLC
Deutsche Bank AG
DFCC Bank PLC
Habib Bank Ltd.
HSBC Sri Lanka (HSBC)
Hatton National Bank PLC
ICICI Bank Ltd.
Indian Bank
Indian Overseas Bank
MCB Bank Ltd.
National Development Bank PLC
Nations Trust Bank PLC
Pan Asia Banking Corporation PLC 
People's Bank
Public Bank Berhad
Sampath Bank PLC
Seylan Bank PLC
Standard Chartered Bank
State Bank of India 
Union Bank of Colombo

Licensed Specialised Banks
Housing Development Finance Corporation Bank of Sri Lanka (HDFC) 
Lankaputhra Development Bank Ltd.
National Savings Bank
Regional Development Bank (Pradheshiya Sanwardhana Bank)
Sanasa Development Bank PLC
Sri Lanka Savings Bank Ltd.
State Mortgage & Investment Bank

Licensed Finance Companies

Abans Finance PLC
Alliance Finance Co. PLC
AMW Capital Leasing and Finance PLC 
Arpico Finance Co. PLC
Asia Asset Finance PLC
Associated Motor Finance Co. PLC
Bimputh Finance PLC
BRAC Lanka Finance PLC
Central Finance Co. PLC
Central Investments & Finance PLC
Chilaw Finance PLC
Citizens Development Business Finance PLC
City Finance Corporation Ltd.
Colombo Trust Finance PLC
Commercial Credit & Finance PLC
Commercial Leasing & Finance PLC
ETI Finance Ltd.
HNB Grameen Finance Ltd.
Ideal Finance Ltd.
Kanrich Finance Ltd.
L B Finance PLC
LOLC Finance PLC
Melsta Regal Finance Ltd.
Mercantile Investments & Finance PLC
Merchant Bank of Sri Lanka & Finance PLC 
Multi Finance PLC
Nation Lanka Finance PLC
Orient Finance PLC
People's Leasing & Finance PLC
People's Merchant Finance PLC
Richard Pieris Finance Ltd.
Sarvodaya Development Finance Co. Ltd.
Senkadagala Finance PLC
Serendib Finance Ltd.
Singer Finance (Lanka) PLC
Sinhaputhra Finance PLC
Siyapatha Finance PLC
Softlogic Finance PLC
Summit Finance PLC 
Swarnamahal Financial Services PLC
The Finance Co. PLC
The Standard Credit Finance Ltd.
TKS Finance Ltd.
Trade Finance & Investments PLC
U B Finance Co. Ltd
Vallibel Finance PLC

Syria

Central bank
Central Bank of Syria

Public banks

Agricultural Cooperative Bank
Commercial Bank of Syria
Industrial Bank of Syria
Popular Credit Bank
Real-Estate Bank
Saving Bank

Private banks

Arab Bank
Audi Bank
Banque BEMO Saudi Fransi
Bank of Syria and Overseas
Byblos Bank
Qatar National Bank
Syria Gulf Bank
The International Bank for Trade & Finance

Islamic banks
Barake Bank
Cham Bank
Syria International Islamic Bank

Taiwan

Central bank
Central Bank of the Republic of China (Taiwan)

Local banks

Bank of Taiwan
Bank Sinopac
Cathay United Bank
Chinatrust Commercial Bank
First Commercial Bank
Hua Nan Bank
Industrial Bank of Taiwan
Land Bank of Taiwan
Mega International Commercial Bank
Shanghai Commercial and Savings Bank
Taipei Fubon Bank
Taishin International Bank
Taiwan Business Bank
Taiwan Cooperative Bank
Union Bank of Taiwan

Thailand

Central bank
Bank of Thailand

Universal banks

ICBC (Thai) Bank  (Formerly ACL Bank)
Bangkok Bank (No.1 bank in Thailand)
Bank of Ayudhya
CIMB Bank Thai (Formerly Union Bank of Bangkok and Bank Thai)
Kasikorn Bank (No.4 bank in Thailand)
Kiatnakin Phatra Bank
Krung Thai Bank (No.2 bank and Government Enterprise in Thailand)
Land & Houses Bank
Siam Commercial Bank (No. 3 bank in Thailand)
Standard Chartered Bank (Thai)
TMBThanachart Bank (No. 5 bank in Thailand, formerly Thai Military Bank and "TMB Bank")
Tisco Bank
United Overseas Bank (Thai) (Formed by the merger of Bank of Asia and UOB Radanasin)

Retail banks
AIG Bank (Thailand)
GE Money Retail Bank (Thailand)(Business sold to Bank of Ayudhya in January 2007)
Thaicredit Retail Bank

Specialized government-owned banks
Bank of Agriculture and Agricultural Cooperatives
Export–Import Bank of Thailand
Government Housing Bank
Government Savings Bank
Islamic Bank of Thailand (IBank)
Small and Medium Enterprise Development Bank of Thailand (SME DBank)

Merged banks
Bank of Asia - merged with UOB Radanasin to form UOB (Thai)
DBS Thai Danu Bank - merged with Thai Military Bank
Industrial Finance Corporation of Thailand - merged with Thai Military Bank
UOB Radanasin Bank - merged with Bank of Asia to form UOB (Thai)
Siam City Bank - merged with Thanachart Bank
Thanachart Bank - merged with "TMB Bank" (Make TMB changed name to "TMBThanachart Bank")

United Arab Emirates

Major commercial banks

ABN AMRO
Abu Dhabi Commercial Bank
Abu Dhabi Investment Authority
Allied Bank
American Express Bank Limited
Arab Bank
Axis Bank
Bank Melli Iran
Bank of America
Bank of Baroda
Bank of China
Bank of India
Bank of Jordan
Bank of New York
Bank Saderat Iran
Central Bank of India
Citibank
Commercial Bank of Dubai
Credit Suisse
Deutsche Bank
 Emirates NBD Bank
First Abu Dhabi Bank
Fortis Bank
Gulf Commercial Bank
Gulf Merchant Bank
Habib Bank AG Zurich
Hang Seng Bank
HSBC
ICICI Bank
Indian Bank
Invest Bank
JPMorgan Chase
MashreqBank
National Bank of Abu Dhabi - merged with First Gulf Bank and became First Abu Dhabi Bank in 2017
National Bank of Kuwait
RAKBANK
Royal Bank of Canada
Royal Bank of Scotland
Scotiabank
Standard Chartered
State Bank of India
Toronto Dominion Bank
United Bank

Islamic banks

Abu Dhabi Islamic Bank
Dubai Islamic Bank
Emirates Islamic Bank
Islamic Commercial Bank
Noor Islamic Bank
Sharjah Islamic Bank

Defunct or merged banks
Bank of Credit and Commerce International

Vietnam

Central bank
 State Bank of Vietnam

State banks

 Bank for Foreign Trade of Vietnam (Vietcombank)
 Bank for Investment and Development of Vietnam (BIDV)
 Mekong Housing Bank (MHB)
 Vietinbank (Vietnam Joint Stock Commercial Bank for Industry and Trade)
 Vietnam Bank for Agriculture and Rural Development (Agribank)
 Vietnam Bank for Social Policy (VBSP)
 Vietnam Development Bank (VDB)

Joint stock banks

Big banks

 ACB (Asia Commercial Bank)
 EAB (Eastern Asia Commercial Bank)
 Eximbank (Vietnam) (Vietnam Export-Import Commercial Bank)
 GP Bank (Global Petrol Commercial Bank)
 Habubank
 LV Bank (Lien Viet Bank)
 MP (Military Bank)
 OCB (Orient Commercial Bank)
 PG Bank (Petrolimex Global Bank)
 Sacombank (Saigon Thuong Tin Bank)
 Saigon Bank (Saigon Cong Thuong Ngan Hang)
 SeABank (South East Asia Commercial Joint Stock Bank)
 Shinhan Bank Vietnam (Shinhan Bank Vietnam)
 Techcombank (Vietnam Technological and Commercial Bank)
 TP Bank (Tien Phong Bank)
 VIB Bank (Vietnam International Commercial Bank)
 VID Public Bank
 VietABank
 VP Bank

Small banks
 Vietnam Russia Joint Venture Bank

Yemen 
 National Bank of Yemen
 Sabaa Islamic Bank

References